The Cochrane Times-Post is a weekly newspaper published on Friday. The newspaper serves Cochrane, Ontario and the surrounding area, and has a weekly circulation of approximately 2,600 copies.

History

The Times purchased the archives of the oldest newspaper in Cochrane in 1994, hence the name Times-Post.   The previous paper was in the community since 1910. The paper is a tabloid newspaper, and focuses on community events, people, etc.

See also
List of newspapers in Canada

External links
 Cochrane Times-Post

Postmedia Network publications
Cochrane, Ontario
Weekly newspapers published in Ontario
Newspapers established in 1910
1910 establishments in Ontario